Juana Reina Castrillo (August 25, 1925 in Seville – March 19, 1999 in Seville) better known as Juanita Reina, was a Spanish actress and copla singer.

She was born in the Sevillian district, la Macarena, Seville and studied in Enrique el Cojo's academy.

She became popular thanks to songs by famous copla songwriters like León or Quiroga and she debuted in movies with La blanca Paloma (White Pigeon) (1941).

On June 15, 1964, she married the flamenco dancer Federico Casado Algrenti, and she later inaugurated a restaurant in Madrid and a dancing academy in Seville.

She died from a respiratory insufficiency and she is buried in the cemetery San Fernando in Seville.

Filmography
 The White Dove (1942)
Cinnamon Flower (1943) 
Serenata española (1947)
 Lola Leaves for the Ports (1947)
 Lola the Coalgirl (1952)
Gloria Mairena (1952)
 Airport (1953)
 It Happened in Seville (1955)
La novia de Juan Lucero (1958)
Canciones de nuestra vida (1975)

External links

 International Jose Guillermo Carrillo Foundation
 

1925 births
1999 deaths
Singers from Andalusia
Spanish actresses
People from Seville
Spanish Roman Catholics
20th-century Spanish actresses
20th-century Spanish singers
20th-century Spanish women singers